Mars Hill Crossroads is an unincorporated community in Forsyth County, in the U.S. state of Georgia.

History
Mars Hill Crossroads was named after a local church, which in turn was named after Mars Hill (Areopagus) in Classical Athens.

References

Unincorporated communities in Forsyth County, Georgia